Dorothy Knowles  (28 March 1906 – 10 November 2010) was a British academic, known to her friends as Diana. She was noted for her research into French drama. She taught at Liverpool University from 1934 to 1967. She was also an accomplished fencer. Knowles is known to historians of British cinema for her 1934 book The Censor, the Drama and the Film, in which she criticised the British Board of Film Censors for what she regarded as unaccountable political censorship. In 1989 she published a study of the work of the playwright Armand Gatti.

Biography
Knowles was born in Johannesburg. Her father was a mining engineer, and, after his death in 1911, the family moved to England, specifically Leeds, in order to deal with the family's finances. Although the family intended to move back to South Africa, the outbreak of World War I meant they could not do so. As a child, Knowles danced alongside Marie Lloyd and Lupino Lane. She was also a fencer, and, in 1936, was the founder of the Liverpool University Fencing Club. Knowles continued fencing well into her 70s.

Academic career
Knowles was an expert on French theater, and perhaps her most important work was French Drama of Inter-War Years 1918-39. Both she and her husband were intermittent lecturers at both Leningrad and Moscow universities. Knowles retired from her position at Liverpool University in 1984 and began spending more time in France. There, she discovered playwright Armand Gatti, and was working on a translation of his work when she died.

References

External links
 Obituary in The Independent, 10 December 2012
 Obituary in The Guardian, 13 December 2010.

1906 births
2010 deaths
Academics of the University of Liverpool
British Board of Film Classification
English centenarians
English women writers
Women centenarians
South African emigrants to the United Kingdom